The NE-Z80 was a homebuilt computer kit presented by Nova Eletrônica magazine on the October 1981 issue, a publication that was part of the Brazilian Prológica group.

It was the first Sinclair ZX80 clone available in Brazil. With an introduction price of Cr$59,900, it was the cheapest microcomputer on sale in the country at the time.

Specifications 
Specifications were similar to the original machine:

 CPU: Z80A @ 3.25 MHz
 Memory: ROM: 4 KiB; RAM: 1 KiB (extendable to 16 KiB)
 Keyboard: 40 keys membrane keyboard
 Display: 32 × 22 text; 64 × 44 semigraphics
 Expansion: 1 slot
 Outputs: 1 TV out (RF modulator, channel 2); cassette tape recorder audio in/out
 Storage: Cassette tape (300 baud)

References 

Prológica
Early microcomputers
Goods manufactured in Brazil
Sinclair ZX80 clones